France was represented by five-member group Profil, with the song "Hé, hé M'sieurs dames", at the 1980 Eurovision Song Contest, which took place on 19 April in The Hague.

Before Eurovision

National final 
Having chosen their 1979 entry by internal selection, broadcaster TF1 returned to a public selection using the same format as in 1976-1978, with two semi-finals followed by the final on 23 March 1980.

Semi-finals 
Each semi-final contained seven songs, with the top three in each going forward to the final. The qualifiers were chosen by public televoting. Other participants included 1969 contest winner Frida Boccara and Minouche Barelli, who had represented Monaco in 1967.

Final 
The final took place on 23 March 1980, hosted by Évelyne Dhéliat. The winner was chosen by public televoting.

At Eurovision 
On the night of the final Profil performed 16th in the running order, following the Netherlands and preceding eventual contest winners Ireland. "Hé, hé, m'sieurs dames" was a rare French venture into uptempo disposable pop, but did not prove to have great appeal as at the close of voting it had picked up 45 points, placing France 11th of the 19 entries and bringing to an end a run of four consecutive top 3 finishes. The French jury awarded its 12 points to the Netherlands.

Voting

References 

1980
Countries in the Eurovision Song Contest 1980
Eurovision
Eurovision